Flipside was a Canadian journalistic music television program which aired on CBC Television in 1974.

Premise
Jim McKenna produced and hosted Flipside, a Montreal-produced program concerning the music industry in Canada. Visiting artists performed on the program and were interviewed by McKenna. Guests included Jim Kale (The Guess Who), The Stampeders. Murray McLauchlan, a winner at the 1974 Juno Awards, was featured in a filmed report. The Ville Emard Blues Band was the subject of another filmed feature.

Scheduling
The half-hour program was broadcast on Saturdays at 6:30 p.m. (Eastern) from 29 June to 14 September 1974.

References

External links
 

CBC Television original programming
1974 Canadian television series debuts
1974 Canadian television series endings
Television shows filmed in Montreal